Camille Sandorfy,  (9 December 1920 – 6 June 2006) was a Hungarian - Canadian quantum chemist.

Born in Budapest, Hungary, he received his Bachelor of Science in 1943 and Ph.D. in chemistry in 1946 from the University of Szeged. In 1949, he received his second doctorate, a D.Sc., from the Sorbonne.

In 1954, he emigrated to Canada for a National Research Council of Canada postdoctoral fellow at the Université de Montréal. From 1954 to 1956, he was an assistant professor at Université de Montréal. From 1956 to 1959, he was an associate professor at Université de Montréal. In 1959, he became a Professor.

He was a member of the International Academy of Quantum Molecular Science.

Scientific research
He pioneered molecular orbital (MO) calculations on σ-bonded polyatomic molecules such as saturated hydrocarbons. He also performed the first MO calculations of the acidity and basicity of aromatic molecules in excited states.

He carried out extensive research in molecular spectroscopy. In infrared spectroscopy he studied molecular vibrations as well as overtone bands in hydrogen-bonded systems, and the effect of hydrogen bonds on vibrational anharmonicity. In electronic spectroscopy he specialized in the far ultraviolet region where he observed a number of molecular Rydberg states.

Some of his spectroscopic studies led to insights into biological processes, including the molecular mechanism of vision and the role of hydrogen bonding in anesthesia.

Honours
 In 1967, he was made a Fellow of the Royal Society of Canada. 
 In 1982, he was awarded the Quebec government's Prix Marie-Victorin.
 In 1993, he was made a Member of the Hungarian Academy of Sciences.
 In 1995, he was made an Officer of the Order of Canada.
 In 1995, he was made a Knight of the National Order of Quebec.

References
 Biography of Camille Sandorfy - Website of l'Ordre national du Québec 
 Fonds Camille Sandorfy 
 Camille Sandorfy Biography by IAQMS (International Academy of Quantum Molecular Science)

1920 births
2006 deaths
Hungarian emigrants to Canada
University of Szeged alumni
University of Paris alumni
Academic staff of the Université de Montréal
Canadian chemists
Fellows of the Royal Society of Canada
Members of the International Academy of Quantum Molecular Science
Knights of the National Order of Quebec
Officers of the Order of Canada
Theoretical chemists
Hungarian expatriates in France